Rafael Figarola González (1882 - death date unknown) was a Cuban baseball catcher in the Cuban League and Negro leagues. He played from 1905 to 1923 with several clubs, including Almendares, the Fe club, the Habana club, the Lincoln Giants, the Brooklyn Royal Giants, and the Cuban Stars (West). Figarola was elected to the Cuban Baseball Hall of Fame in 1950. He was also listed as Jose Figarola.

References

External links
 and Baseball-Reference Cuban / Black Baseball stats and Seamheads

1882 births
Cuban League players
Almendares (baseball) players
Brooklyn Royal Giants players
Club Fé players
Cuban Stars (West) players
Habana players
Lincoln Giants players
San Francisco Park players
Year of death unknown
People from Pinar del Río
Cuban expatriate baseball players in the United States